Dr Vikas Mishra (10 January 1924 – 22 January 2008) was an Indian Economist and a vice-chancellor of Kurukshetra University, Haryana. He joined the university in the Department of Economics in 1962 after serving in the Delhi School of Economics & the Institute of Economic Growth, Delhi. With his M.A. in Economics from the University of Manchester, Dr Mishra completed his Ph.D. from the London School of Economics and research under the guidance of Nobel laureate Sir William Arthur Lewis.

Struggle for freedom
Dr Vikas Mishra was born in 1924. With the struggle for freedom on its peak and the country united in its fight for independence, Dr Mishra still studying in school formed a village revolutionary cell to fight for Indian Freedom. A small library was established in the remote village from where he belonged to motivate the youth. Attempts were also made to blow off railway bridges. One instance that Dr Mishra always recounted was the demonstration against the British atrocities in Bettiah. A day before the demonstration many people gathered in Bettiah including Dr Mishra and his friend Kedar Pandey (who went on to become the Railway Minister in Independent India). With these two young bloods in the forefront of the procession Pandit Durga Mishra Ji, their uncle knew that they would be in the line of fire by the British, sensing the danger to the young comrades he locked them both in a house and handed over the keys to one of his trusted lieutenants. Many people died in the police firing and the Bettiah Shaheed (Martyr) Memorial in West Champaran is still a testimony to the incident.
Later on he went to jail twice during the freedom struggle. According to Dr Mishra young boys in jail like him were called "Gandhi Boys" by the British Tommies (policemen). Another memorial for freedom fighters with his name is located at Narkatiaganj Block Office.

Alma Mater
After India's Independence Dr Mishra, who was studying Law to help Indian freedom fighters, decided not to become a practising lawyer. Teaching and research were to be his future. Without any government funding, he went to England for further studies. Earlier he did his M.Com. and LL.B. from Lucknow University.
After teaching for five years, he went to England in 1952 and earned his M.A.(Economics) from the University of Manchester and his PhD from the London School of Economics.

Career
Dr Mishra worked as a Senior Economist on the team of the Techno-Economic Survey of Bihar undertaken by the NCAER. He was also at the Delhi School of Economics and the Institute of Economic Growth, Delhi before shifting to Kurukshetra University where, later on, he became the Registrar & the youngest Vice-Chancellor. He has proved a worthy student of his worthy teacher Sir William Arthur Lewis, a Nobel Laureate.
Professor C. H. Hanumantha Rao, an illustrious student of Dr Mishra, on being conferred Padma Bhushan, said in his felicitation speech:
“I learnt precision in writing from Professor Vikas Mishra who was my supervisor for Ph.D thesis. Prof. Mishra used to say, ‘one should always ask whether the sentence that one has written is really necessary’. After reading the first draft of my thesis, he suggested deletion of a number of passages by putting round brackets indicating the portions to be deleted. On one occasion he picked up from his shelf an old draft of his own thesis and showed me the similar round brackets placed by his supervisor, Arthur Lewis who was later to be awarded the Nobel Prize in Economics.”

Contribution
Dr Mishra's contributions were often quoted by noted scholars. In their books 'India:Social Structure' and 'Social Transformation in Modern India' noted Indian Sociologist Dr MN Srinivas and Dr A Kumar quoted Prof. Mishra as "In his book Hinduism and Economic growth,1962, Dr. Vikas Mishra has made a study of the occupational patterns of the different religious groups in India. He concludes that the occupational distribution of the Parsis, Jews and Jains is “advanced” though not diversified. Hindus and Muslims have a diversified occupational pattern while the tribal's pattern is neither advanced nor diversified.
Dr Mishra's analysis points to the conclusion that minority religions are advantageously situated as far as occupational distribution is concerned. It is likely, however, that there are differences between one region of India and another. Syrian Christians, for instance, show a more “advanced” pattern in Travancore than in North Kerala. Similarly, Moplahs in North Kerala are more advanced than their co-coreligionists in South and Central Kerala. This is perhaps related to the fact that in North Kerala the Moplahs formerly wielded political power."

Dr Mishra’s concept of his “Growth Multiplier” precedes Professor Hirschman's "linkage effects" which is clear by his claim in his book "The Growth Multiplier and a General Theory of Economic Growth”, pp. 7. He says “The direct investment effect sounds very much like Professor Hirschman’s linkage effects. But perhaps I should mention that two of my earlier drafts had been circulated before his Strategy of Economic Development was published.”

K S Chalam writes in his book Social Enquiry of Development in India, pp.350, Sage Publications,"It was Vikas Mishra who studied Hinduism and found that it was not conducive for rapid economic development due to several rigidities and perhaps prepared Raj Krishna later to coin what is called the Hindu rate of growth."Again at pp.372 he writes,'Vikas Mishra was an economist who worked on the Economics of Religion first time in India. Mishra, Hinduism and Economic Growth (New Delhi: Oxford University Press, 1962). Mishra trained Raj Krishna, Agricultural economist, Member, Planning Commission, who has coined the popular term "Hindu rate of growth".'

Publications
Dr Mishra wrote the following books:

HINDUISM AND ECONOMIC GROWTH. Oxford University Press,1962.

THE GROWTH MULTIPLIER. Asia Publishing House, 1962.

FROM THE AUTOBIOGRAPHY OF ECONOMIC THEORY. 1980.

THE STUDY OF PRODUCT BEHAVIOUR, 1984.

MUJHE KOI BULATA HAI.

See also 
Baidyanath Misra

References

1924 births
2008 deaths
20th-century Indian economists
Academic staff of Delhi University
Alumni of the University of Manchester
Kurukshetra University
Scholars from Haryana
Indian academic administrators
University of Lucknow alumni
People from Kurukshetra